Crescent Park was an amusement park in Riverside, East Providence, Rhode Island which ran from 1886 to 1979. During the park's 93-year run, it entertained millions of New Englanders as well as people from all over the world. The park was known for its Rhode Island Shore Dinners, the Alhambra Ballroom and its midway.

Declining attendance during the 1970s forced the park to close. The land was cleared for a housing development.

The only remaining amusement ride is the completely restored 1895-vintage Crescent Park Looff Carousel, designed and built by Charles I.D. Looff as a showpiece for his carousel business.

History

19th century
Crescent Park was founded in 1886 by George B. Boyden, who leased land on Narragansett Bay from John Davis, the owner of the Bullock's Point Hotel which sat above a bathing beach on the Bay. Several years later Boyden purchased the hotel and changed its name to the Crescent Park Hotel which continued to be operated until 1935, when it was razed to make room for a parking lot for the park. Boyden named the park after the crescent shape of the beach.

In 1892, carousel builder Charles I. D. Looff installed the park's first carousel. The ride's building was built on columns over the beach next to the 400' pier that was used by steamboats traveling up and down Narragansett Bay and the Providence River. In 1895, Looff built a second carousel for the park, now known as the Crescent Park Looff Carousel. The ride has 61 hand-carved horses, 1 camel, 4 chariots and a spectacular German band organ built by A. Ruth & Sohn. This carousel has been renovated, restored and is running to this day. He also built the park's first roller coaster, called the Toboggan Racer.

A large shore dinner hall was built on the bluff overlooking the Bay. The Riverside area had become well known for its many hotels, campsites and clam bake sites. 
In 1900, LaMarcus Thompson built a scenic railway next to the Looff carousel.

20th century

In 1901, Boyden sold the park to the Dexter Brothers of the Hope Land Company, with Colonel R.A. Harrington acting as park manager.

By 1902, a huge exhibition hall (326'x 122'x 49') was built on the midway, and was used by The New England Association for Arts and Crafts for their annual exposition. The hall was subsequently turned into the Alhambra Ballroom.

In 1905, Charles I. D. Looff moved his carousel factory from Brooklyn to Crescent Park, where he designed and built many carousel for parks in New England and around the United States. He also began to use the Crescent Park carousel as a showcase for his business. During this time, Looff built a tunnel-of-love ride called The Rivers of Venice

In 1910, Looff moved to Long Beach, California and established a second factory there. His son Charles Jr. and daughter Helen managed the company's Crescent Park operations after their father left.

Charles Looff Jr. oversaw several renovations to the park, including the construction in 1914 of a new shore dinner hall on the banks of the Bay capable of seating 2000 patrons. Looff Jr. then opened up the floor plan of the Alhambra Ballroom by installing massive beams in the roof and removing all the interior columns. In 1916, he built a 150' excursion boat named the Miss Looff after his younger sister who had been killed in a trolley accident in New York. In 1920, he purchased the park from the Hope Land Company and operated it until his death in 1925. 

In 1922, Looff Jr. began to operate a radio station, WKAD, on the park grounds. Following his death three years later, Beacon Manufacturing Company purchased the park after his estate defaulted on mortgage payments.

The park was damaged by the 1938 New England Hurricane, with the pier and Comet roller coaster sustaining the most damage. Both were subsequently rebuilt. In 1951, the park was purchased by a group of park concessionaires led by Arthur R. Simmons and Frederick McCusker for $329,390. Many improvements were made during the next 15 years. New rides, such as the Flying fish (Wild Mouse), the Satellite (Roundup), a Turnpike Ride, an 1860s Train Ride and a Sky Ride were added, food operations were improved, and free entertainment was offered to the public. 

The park exchanged hands again in 1966, when it was bought by three Providence investors, Melvin Berry, Max Sugarman and Joe Paolino Sr. Three years after the purchase, on September 2, 1969, the Alhambra Ballroom burned down.

Final years (1975-1979)
In 1975, the park's ownership group, Crescent Park Recreation Corporation, filed for Chapter 11 bankruptcy. HNC Real Estates Investors, a REIT affiliated with The Hartford National Bank, took over the park, and operated the park during 1976 and 1977 until zoning could be changed and a buyer was located. 

Concern over the future of the park's carousel grew during rumours that the park would be closed and auctioned off. That year, the "Save Our Carousel Committee" was formed by several Riverside residents, who, after a long legal battle, successfully saved the carousel. The park closed permanently after the 1977 season.

In 1979, the Crescent Park property and rides, except the carousel, were sold at auction.

After closure and preservation of carousel (1980-present)

Part of the midway was destroyed by a fire in March 1980. In 1982, the Kelly & Picerne real estate firm purchased the park property from the City of East Providence for $825,000 for residential development. However, they agreed to preserve the carousel and beach. The shore dining hall burned down in another fire in July 1984.

The renovated carousel was reopened on July 17, 1984. In 1985, it was named "The State Jewel of American Folk Art" by the Rhode Island General Assembly. It was named a National Historic Landmark by the National Park Service in 1987. The carousel's foundation was rebuilt in 2000 following a $150,000 "Save America's Treasures" grant from The National Trust for Historic Preservation. The ring gear, original to the ride, was replaced in 2010.

See also
 List of amusement parks in New England
 Charles I. D. Looff
 List of defunct amusement parks
 Amusement ride

References
 Rhode Island Amusement Parks by Rob Lewis and Ryan Young (1998)Arcadia Publishing,Charleston, SC. 
 East Providence by East Providence Historical Society (1997)Arcadia Publishing,NH. 
 A Century of Fun - A Pictorial History of New England Amusement Parks by Bob Goldsack (1993)Published by: Midway Museum Publications, Nashua, NH. 
 The Outdoor Amusement Industry - From Earliest Times to The Present by William Mangels (1952) Vantage Press Inc., NY Library of Congress Catalog Card Number: 52-13299
 Our Heritage: A History of East Providence (1976) Monarch Publishing, Inc., White Plains, NY Library of Congress Catalog Card Number: 75-27782
 Rhode Island Amusement Parks by Rob Lewis and Ryan Young (1998) Published by Arcadia Publishing, Charleston, SC. 
 The Carousel News & Trader November, 2010, Page 20. 11001 Peoria Street, Sun Valley, CA 91352-1631 
 The East Providence Post March 22, 1979 - article by John Caruthers
 Crescent Park's page on Art In Ruins
 Echoes of Summer (copyright 1989 by Cable TV of East Providence)
 Tribute site
 Radio Service Bulletin 65 (September 1st 1922), p.3
 WKAD listing in 1923
 WKAD listing in 1924
 WKAD listing in 1925
 Radio Service Bulletin 106 (January 30th 1926), p. 7

Defunct amusement parks in the United States
Rhode Island culture
Amusement parks in Rhode Island
1886 establishments in Rhode Island
1979 disestablishments in Rhode Island